Sarbaz County is in Sistan and Baluchestan province, Iran. The capital of the county is the city of Sarbaz. At the 2006 census, the county's population was 162,960, in 31,449 households. The following census in 2011 counted 164,557 people in 35,820 households, by which time Ashar District had been separated from the county to participate in the formation of Mehrestan County. At the 2016 census, the county's population was 186,165 in 45,910 households. Rask was the capital of Sarbaz County before the separation of the Central, Parud and Pishin Districts to form Rask County.

Administrative divisions

The population history and structural changes of Sarbaz County's administrative divisions over three consecutive censuses are shown in the following table. The latest census shows four districts, 11 rural districts, and three cities.

References

 

Counties of Sistan and Baluchestan Province